Manuel Armijo (ca. 1793–1853) was a New Mexican soldier and statesman who served three times as governor of New Mexico. He was instrumental in putting down the Revolt of 1837, he led the force that captured the Texan Santa Fe Expedition, and he later surrendered to the United States in the Mexican–American War, leading to the Capture of Santa Fe.

Early life and first governorship
Manuel Armijo was born around 1793 in the Albuquerque, New Mexico area, most likely in Belen. He was the son of Vicente Ferrer Durán y Armijo and Bárbara Casilda Durán y Chávez, both from prominent New Mexico families. Vicente Armijo and his family resided in the Plaza de San Antonio de Belén during the 1790s, and according to the Spanish census, Vicente was a stockman and lieutenant in the militia. Manuel Armijo married María Trinidad Gabaldón in 1819. The couple did not have children but adopted a daughter named Ramona, who was named "my universal heir and daughter" in Manuel's will. Ramona Armijo was married to Luís C. de Baca of Socorro, New Mexico.
 
According to George Wilkins Kendall, Armijo became wealthy by working for a sheep rancher and stealing and selling the sheep, often to his own employer; but Kendall was writing about his experience as Armijo's prisoner in 1841 and his biographical sketch of Armijo is scurrilous. The historian Marc Simmons ascribes the story of sheep theft to "tradition". William Wroth wrote on the New Mexico State Historian's Website, "Governor Armijo was portrayed by George Wilkins Kendall as having been an uneducated man from a poor family who worked his way up by stealing. This gross caricature was Kendall's way of vilifying Armijo due to his perception that the Governor had treated him unfairly in 1841 in the capture of the disastrous Texas Santa Fe expedition." In general, according to many Hispanic New Mexicans, historians have been unfair in their telling of the history of Manuel Armijo. Angélico Chávez wrote, "Manuel Armijo's character as Governor and as a man has been unjustly painted in sources too numerous to mention here."

Armijo became the alcalde (mayor) of Albuquerque and militia lieutenant in 1822 and 1824. In 1827, he was appointed governor of New Mexico, but in 1828 he returned from Santa Fe to Albuquerque as a wealthy merchant in sheep and wool blankets, acting as alcalde again. Some have it that he left the governorship to avoid a Federal investigation.

In 1836 Armijo was appointed subcomisario, collector of customs, of New Mexico; this was a fund-raising position that involved work in Santa Fe. However, for health reasons he spent most of his time in Albuquerque and was replaced.

Revolt of 1837
In August 1837 disaffected residents of the northern part of New Mexico assassinated Governor Albino Pérez and took over the state (the Revolt of 1837). Many people in the southern part opposed the new government, but several prominent people refused to lead a counterrevolution. Mariano Chávez, a wealthy young relative of Armijo's, proposed him for the position and Armijo accepted. He marched to Santa Fe and declared himself governor, a position that the Mexican government also gave him when the news of the rebellion reached them (and not when Armijo's letter announcing his self-appointment reached them later, contrary to Kendall's account).

Armijo wrote to the government requesting federal troops, and trained soldiers under Lt. Col. Cayetano Justiniani of the Veracruz dragoons arrived in early January 1838. Later that month the rebellion flared up again and Armijo led the force that defeated the rebels at Pojoaque. According to Armijo's letters to the Mexican historian Carlos María Bustamante, he was nominally in command but his forces were really led by Justiniani.

Beginning with Kendall, some American authors have accused Armijo of starting the rebellion that he later put down. The trader and writer Josiah Gregg said Armijo's brother "intimated" to Gregg that Armijo had ridden from Albuquerque to Santa Fe expecting the rebels to elect him governor. As he had taken no personal part in the insurrection, they "would not acknowledge his claim to their suffrages," so he returned to Albuquerque to plot the counterrevolution. The historian Janet Lecompte doubts this story and notes that there is no documentary evidence of any involvement of Armijo in the Revolt of 1837.

Second term
In 1841 Armijo successfully repelled the Texan Santa Fe Expedition. He evidently authorized false promises of safe conduct, but instead took the Texan merchants and soldiers into custody and sent them further south in Mexico as prisoners.

Stories about Armijo's corruption made it into Euro-American accounts of the region to justify a U.S. invasion. It was also rumored that he was having an illicit affair with the wealthy Santa Fe saloon owner Maria Gertrudis "Tules" Barceló.

Also during this period he eagerly approved land grants to Americans, selling  in some of the largest land grants ever made. Charles Bent was given part of that land, even though he was not a Mexican citizen. When Padre Martinez of Taos learned of the grant, he raised such a strong objection that Armijo withdrew the grant that summer. Armijo later reinstated the grant when Beaubien died, giving it to his son-in-law, Lucien Maxwell.

In 1843 the Republic of Texas sent another force into New Mexico to retaliate for the capture of the Texan Santa Fe Expedition and Mexican attacks on Texas. This force, with something over 200 men, defeated a New Mexican advance party. He then resigned his position as military commander and in the following year, the governorship, "claiming ill health".

Third term and Mexican–American War
Nevertheless, he was appointed to his third governorship in 1845. The following year, the Mexican–American War started and General Stephen Kearny brought about 1,700 soldiers to conquer New Mexico. Armijo heard of the plan in late June from an American business partner who arrived with a caravan on the Santa Fe Trail. Armijo sold his interest in their business to his partner and began liquidating his many other assets. Armijo also sent in a request to the Mexican government asking for regular troops to be sent for defense of New Mexico.  The Mexican government officials promised to send these forces, yet they never arrived.

He also received a large amount of ammunition and supplies from a caravan out of Independence, Missouri. On August 4, as Kearny crossed what is now the border between Colorado and New Mexico, Armijo signed a power of attorney so that an associate could take care of his affairs after he left. On August 8 he issued a proclamation to the people of New Mexico exhorting them to prepare to repel the invasion.

On about August 9 Armijo called a meeting with a number of respected New Mexicans. He did not want to fight, but the priests present did, as did the young regular-army commander, Diego Archuleta, and the young militia officers Manuel Chaves and Miguel Pino. According to a refugee from the war, Armijo would have done nothing toward defense if the latter two had not threatened to shoot him. Then on August 12 or 13 he received an American named James Magoffin, the husband of a relative of his, who later claimed to have convinced Armijo not to fight. An unverified story says that Magoffin bribed them. Magoffin later requested a reimbursement from the U.S. Treasury of $50,000, of which he received $30,000.

Another version of this story is that a spy of Governor Armijo was captured by Kearny, and  given a tour of Kearny's forces in order for the spy to report to Armijo about the size and strength of the United States forces. Next Kearny sent Anglo-American trader, "James Magoffin, along with Captain Philip St. George Cooke and twelve dragoons to meet with the governor." Manuel Alvarez arranged a meeting with Armijo, his officials and Magoffin and St. George Cooke.  According to Alvarez, despite knowing the size and strength of the United States forces, Governor Armijo was the only government official who wanted to defend New Mexico while the others were convinced that a disastrous defeat would be the outcome of any futile attempt at defense.

It wasn't until the governor called for the militia to meet at Apache Canyon to prepare for defense of New Mexico that he changed his mind.  When he saw that his militia had weapons of spears, bows, arrows and outdated firearms, he knew they were outnumbered, too under-trained and under-equipped to meet the regular United States's army. After inspecting his men, he sent them home. Armijo decided he should go to Mexico and plead for more help from the Mexican government. According to a previous New Mexico State Historian, Thomas E. Chávez, there is no evidence that Armijo ever took a bribe, yet to the contrary, there is evidence to prove that Armijo was one of the few who wanted to fight the invaders.

Around this same time some Santa Feans talked of killing the American traders in the town, but Armijo put a stop to the plan and dismissed Archuleta. When Pino, Chaves and some of the militiamen insisted, Armijo ordered the cannon pointed at them. All of the New Mexican army retreated to Santa Fe and Armijo fled to Chihuahua, while Kearny and his force entered Santa Fe and claimed New Mexico for the U.S. without a shot fired.

Armijo was tried in Mexico City for cowardice and desertion in the face of the enemy, but he was acquitted. While in Mexico City, he interceded on behalf of Magoffin, who had been arrested as a spy in Chihuahua.

Armijo later returned to Lemitar, New Mexico, and lived the rest of his life there. He is buried in the churchyard (Camposanto Iglesia) in front of San Miguel de Socorro, in the northwest corner. One of his sons, Manuel Armijo, served as Colonel of the New Mexico Militia in the American Civil War, participating in the Battle of Valverde.

Notes

References

External links

Contemporary portrait at Invasión Yanqui, accessed 19 June 2006
Biography of Manuel Armijo from New Mexico State Historian's Site
Ancestry of Governor Manuel Armijo

1793 births
1853 deaths
Mexican governors of Santa Fe de Nuevo México
Mexican soldiers
Politicians from Albuquerque, New Mexico
Mexican military personnel of the Mexican–American War
19th-century American politicians
People from Belen, New Mexico